"Five Characters in Search of an Exit" is episode 79 of the television anthology series The Twilight Zone. It originally aired on December 22, 1961.

Opening narration

Plot
A uniformed U.S. Army major wakes up to find himself trapped inside a large metal cylinder, where he meets a hobo, a ballet dancer, a bagpiper, and a clown. All of them have different theories regarding their presence here, although they admit none of them are realistic. They also have no memory of who they are, or how they became trapped, and they do not seem to have any need for food or water. The major, being the newest arrival, is the most determined to escape. He is told there is no way of either breaking through or climbing up the cylinder.

Eventually, the major suggests a plan to escape: forming a tower of people, each person on the other's shoulders. However, the dancer at the top of the tower is still a few inches short of the cylinder's top, and a loud clanging sound shakes the cylinder and sends the five tumbling to the ground. The major demands that they all make a promise to not leave the cylinder until everyone else has left.

Now even more determined, the major fashions a grappling hook out of loose bits of clothing and his sword. By reforming the tower, he manages to grapple onto the edge of the cylinder. As he turns to survey the area surrounding the cylinder, he tumbles to the ground outside. The clown inside the cylinder briefly bemoans the loss, saying how the major left without them and if he comes back, it won’t be to get them out. The clown then admits that the major was right after all: they are all in Hell.

Just then a little girl picks up a doll from the snow, in the dress of an army major. The cylinder is a Christmas toy collection barrel for a girls' orphanage, and all five characters are dolls. The loud clanging was the ringing of a bell, used by a woman to attract donations; she tells the girl to return the doll to the barrel.

The five characters, now dolls with painted faces and glass eye, lay unmoving. The ballet dancer moves to hold the hand of the major as her eyes fill with tears.

Closing narration

Cast
 Susan Harrison as Ballerina
 William Windom as Major
 Murray Matheson as Clown 
 Kelton Garwood as Hobo
 Clark Allen as Bagpiper

Episode notes
The episode's title is a variation on the Pirandello play Six Characters in Search of an Author and existentialist Sartre play No Exit, both of which served as inspiration for the script . 

Dolls were specially crafted for the final shots that closely resembled the actors who had played the parts.

Legacy
The episode was reportedly an inspiration for the 1997 film Cube.  The TV series Felicity paid homage in its episode "Help for the Lovelorn"; both episodes were directed by Lamont Johnson.

References

External links

Five Characters in Search of an Exit Review at The Twilight Zone Project

1961 American television episodes
The Twilight Zone (1959 TV series season 3) episodes
Adaptations of works by Luigi Pirandello
Existentialist works
Sentient toys in fiction
Television episodes written by Rod Serling
Television shows based on short fiction
Television shows about clowns
Absurdist fiction